Nachhipuria is a village in the town of Betnoti in the Mayurbhanj district of Orissa, India. The population in 2011 was 1332.

References

Villages in Mayurbhanj district